Augusto Ruschi Biological Reserve is a Federal biological reserve in the state of Espírito Santo, Brazil.
It holds dense rainforest of the Atlantic Forest biome.

History

It was created on 20 September 1982 and is administered by the Chico Mendes Institute for Biodiversity Conservation.
It became part of the Central Atlantic Forest Ecological Corridor, created in 2002.
The reserve is classified as International Union for Conservation of Nature (IUCN) category Ia (strict nature reserve).
It is in the Santa Teresa municipality of Espírito Santo state.

Status

The reserve is mostly covered in dense rainforest, with many species of flora, some of which are rare.
Streams rising in the reserve flow into the Doce, Timbuí and Piraqueaçú rivers.

Protected birds in the reserve include the red-browed amazon (Amazona rhodocorytha), white-necked hawk (Leucopternis lacernulatus), Atlantic black-breasted woodpecker (Celeus torquatus tinnunculus), rufous-brown solitaire (Cichlopsis leucogenys), purple-winged ground dove (Claravis godefrida), black-bellied thorntail (Discosura langsdorffi), Salvadori's antwren (Myrmotherula minor) and brown-backed parrotlet (Touit melanonotus).
Protected mammals include the maned sloth (Bradypus torquatus), Atlantic titi  (Callicebus personatus), northern muriqui (Brachyteles hypoxanthus), buffy-headed marmoset (Callithrix flaviceps), ocelot (Leopardus pardalis) and cougar (Puma concolor capricornensis).
Other protected species include the black uruçu (Melipona capixaba) and pinthous mimic white (Moschoneura pinthous methymna).

Notes

Sources

Biological reserves of Brazil
Protected areas of Espírito Santo
Protected areas of the Atlantic Forest
1982 establishments in Brazil
Protected areas established in 1982